Robert Ivy (FAIA) is the Executive Vice President and Chief Executive Officer of the American Institute of Architects (AIA) since 2011.

Biography
Robert Ivy holds a Master of Architecture from Tulane University and a Bachelor of Arts (cum laude) in English from Sewanee: The University of the South.

In 1996, Ivy became the Editor in Chief of Architectural Record. He became Vice President and Editorial Director of McGraw-Hill Construction Media, which included GreenSource: The Magazine of Sustainable Design, SNAP, Architectural Record: China, HQ Magazine, ENR, Constructor, and Sweets. From 1981 until 1996, he was a principal at Dean/Dale, Dean & Ivy and a critic for many national publications.

Ivy was a juror on the panel that selected architect Frank Gehry to design the National Dwight D. Eisenhower Memorial.

In December 2010, Robert Ivy was named CEO of the American Institute of Architects (AIA), effective February 2011.

Other roles 

 Senior Fellow of the Design Futures Council

Awards

 2018: Noel Polk Lifetime Achievement Award by the Mississippi Institute of Arts and Letters
2010: Master Architect by Alpha Rho Chi (the only architect selected in the 21st century)
2009: Crain Award
 1998: McGraw-Hill Award for Management Excellence
1993: AIA College of Fellows

Publications

 Fay Jones: Architect

Notes

Year of birth missing (living people)
Living people
American architects
American magazine editors
People from Columbus, Mississippi
Sewanee: The University of the South alumni
Tulane School of Architecture alumni
Auburn University people
Journalists from Mississippi
Journalists from New York City
American chief executives